StarMetro or Star Metro may refer to:
StarMetro (newspaper), a chain of daily free commuter newspapers in Canada
StarMetro (bus service), a public bus system in Tallahassee, Florida